The Aero 45 was a twin-piston engined civil utility aircraft produced in Czechoslovakia after World War II. Aero Vodochody produced the aircraft in 1947–1951, after which the Let Kunovice rolled out these planes until 1961. In 1958 the Ae-45S became the first Czechoslovak plane to cross the Atlantic Ocean. It was the first product of the nation's postwar aviation industry and proved a great success, with many of the 590 produced being exported.

Design and development

Development began 1946 and was accomplished by the technical designers Jiři Bouzek, Ondřej Němec and František Vik. The design bears a superficial resemblance, when viewed nose-on, to the much larger German Siebel Si 204 which, among other German aircraft were produced in Czechoslovakia while under German occupation. The prototype (registered OK-BCA) flew for the first time on 21 July 1947 and the second, registered OK-CDA, one year later. Flight testing ran without incidents and the type was released for series production in 1948. The model number of "45" was not a continuation of Aero's pre-war numeration scheme, but a reference to the 4/5 seats in the aircraft.

Description
The Aero 45 had a sleek, teardrop-shaped fuselage, with a rounded, extensively-glazed nose affording excellent visibility. It had a low wing on which the engine nacelles were mounted, and a conventional tail. The main undercarriage was retractable but the tailwheel was fixed.

Operational history
Ae-45 prototypes were widely advertised abroad. In August 1949 Jan Anderle won the Norton Griffiths Race in Great Britain (Ae-45 registration OK-DCL). They also set several international records. As a result, apart from Eastern Bloc countries, the plane was also bought by Italy and Switzerland. On 10–11 August 1958 Dr. Pier Paolo Brielli flew an Italian Ae-45 3000 kilometers from South America to Dakar across the southern Atlantic (as the first Czechoslovak-built aircraft). In 1981 Jon Svensen flew Ae-45S from Europe to the USA.

This type was used in Czechoslovakia and was exported to the People's Republic of China, East Germany, France, Hungary, Italy, Poland, Romania, Soviet Union and Switzerland. Hungary was a major customer, where the aircraft was known as the Kócsag (Hungarian: "Egret").

Variants

Aero 45
First production version built in Aero factory. 200 built between 1948 and 1951.
Aero 45S "Super Aero"
Improved variant produced by Let in Kunovice factory, among others with better navigational equipment. 228 aircraft built between 1954 and 1959.
Aero 145 (I)
Larger five-seat derivative of Ae-45 powered by Walter Minor 6-III engines and tricycle landing gear, not built.
Aero 145 (II)
Version with engines changed to supercharged Motorlet (Walter) M332, produced later as Avia M 332s. This version was developed and built by Let, 162 aircraft built between 1959 and 1961.
Aero 245
Similar to 145, but with a tailwheel, not built.
Aero 345
Aero 45 airframe powered by Walter Minor 6-III engines, not built.
Sungari-1
Chinese unlicensed copy of the Aero Ae 45S, produced from 1958.

Operators

Civil operators

 Commodore Aviation

Interflug  

Hungarian Police
Hungarian Air Ambulance Service

LOT Polish Airlines operated three Ae-45 in 1952–1957
Polish Air Ambulance Service operated Ae-45 and Ae-145

Aviasan

Aeroflot

Aeroclub Ajdovščina
 
 Vietnam Civil Aviation Department – later as Vietnam Civil Aviation (now Vietnam Airlines)

Military operators

People's Liberation Army Air Force operated license-built Suingari-1 variant.

Czechoslovak Air Force operated aircraft under designation K-75, for liaison purpose.
Czechoslovakian National Security Guard

East German Air Force

Hungarian Air Force

Indian Air Force operated a single aircraft gifted by the Czech government

Katangese Air Force

Romanian Air Force

 Vietnam People's Air Force – three Ae-45 from 1956 (acquired from China)

Specifications (Aero 145)

See also

References

Further reading

External links

 Pictures of various Ae 45s at airliners.net

Ae 45
1940s Czechoslovakian civil utility aircraft
1940s Czechoslovakian military utility aircraft
Aircraft first flown in 1947
Low-wing aircraft
Twin piston-engined tractor aircraft